Cheshmeh Sefid (also Romanized as Cheshmeh Sefīd) is a village in Torud Rural District, in the Central District of Shahrud County, Semnan Province, Iran. At the 2006 census, its population was 21, in 6 families.

References 

Populated places in Shahrud County